

The Cierva C.9 was an experimental autogyro built by Cierva in England in 1927, in association with Avro. It was the first of Cierva's autogyro designs to feature an original, purpose-built fuselage (as opposed to re-using fuselages from existing fixed-wing aircraft). Two examples were built - a single-seat machine (known to Avro as the Type 576) and a two-seater (the Type 581).

References

See also

1920s British experimental aircraft
Single-engined tractor autogyros
Aircraft first flown in 1927
C.9